In enzymology, an oxaloglycolate reductase (decarboxylating) is an enzyme that catalyzes the chemical reaction

D-glycerate + NAD(P)+ + CO2  2-hydroxy-3-oxosuccinate + NAD(P)H + 2 H+

The 4 substrates of this enzyme are D-glycerate, NAD+, NADP+, and CO2, whereas its 4 products are 2-hydroxy-3-oxosuccinate, NADH, NADPH, and H+.

This enzyme belongs to the family of oxidoreductases, specifically those acting on the CH-OH group of donor with NAD+ or NADP+ as acceptor.  The systematic name of this enzyme class is D-glycerate:NAD(P)+ oxidoreductase (carboxylating). This enzyme participates in glyoxylate and dicarboxylate metabolism.

References

 

EC 1.1.1
NADPH-dependent enzymes
NADH-dependent enzymes
Enzymes of unknown structure